John Hungerford (ca. 1560 – 1636) was an English MP.

He was the eldest of Walter Hungerford of Cadnam and trained in the law at the Inner Temple (1580).

He was elected MP for the constituency of  Wootton Bassett through four successive parliaments between 1584 and 1593. He served a fifth term for Chippenham in 1604–1611.

He was a Justice of the Peace by 1594 for Wiltshire and Gloucestershire and appointed High Sheriff of Wiltshire for 1605–06.

He married Elizabeth, the daughter of Sir Thomas Estcourt of Shipton, Gloucestershire; they had 5 sons and 3 daughters.

References

1560s births
1636 deaths
English MPs 1584–1585
English MPs 1586–1587
English MPs 1589
English MPs 1593
English MPs 1604–1611
High Sheriffs of Wiltshire